The 5th Golden Satellite Awards, given by the International Press Academy, were awarded on January 14, 2001.

Special achievement awards
Career of Outstanding Service in the Entertainment Industry – Thom Mount

Mary Pickford Award (for outstanding contribution to the entertainment industry) – Francis Ford Coppola

Outstanding New Talent – Rob Brown

Motion picture winners and nominees

Best Actor – Drama
 Geoffrey Rush – Quills
Jamie Bell – Billy Elliot
Sean Connery – Finding Forrester
Russell Crowe – Gladiator
Ed Harris – Pollock
Denzel Washington – Remember the Titans

Best Actor – Musical or Comedy
 Michael Douglas – Wonder Boys
George Clooney – O Brother, Where Art Thou?
Richard Gere – Dr. T & the Women
Christopher Guest – Best in Show
Eddie Murphy – Nutty Professor II: The Klumps
Edward Norton – Keeping the Faith

Best Actress – Drama
 Ellen Burstyn – Requiem for a Dream
Björk – Dancer in the Dark
Joan Allen – The Contender
Gillian Anderson – The House of Mirth
Laura Linney – You Can Count on Me
Julia Roberts – Erin Brockovich

Best Actress – Musical or Comedy
 Renée Zellweger – Nurse Betty
Brenda Blethyn – Saving Grace
Sandra Bullock – Miss Congeniality
Glenn Close – 102 Dalmatians
Cameron Diaz – Charlie's Angels
Jenna Elfman – Keeping the Faith

Best Animated or Mixed Media Film
 Chicken Run
Dinosaur
The Emperor's New Groove
Rugrats in Paris: The Movie
Titan A.E.

Best Art Direction
 The House of Mirth – Don Taylor
Crouching Tiger, Hidden Dragon (Wo hu cang long)
Gladiator
How the Grinch Stole Christmas
Traffic

Best Cinematography
 Gladiator – John Mathieson
Crouching Tiger, Hidden Dragon (Wo hu cang long)
The Legend of Bagger Vance
Mission: Impossible 2
Traffic

Best Costume Design
 How the Grinch Stole Christmas – Rita Ryack
Crouching Tiger, Hidden Dragon (Wo hu cang long)
Gladiator
The House of Mirth
The Patriot

Best Director
 Steven Soderbergh – Traffic
Cameron Crowe – Almost Famous
Philip Kaufman – Quills
Ang Lee – Crouching Tiger, Hidden Dragon (Wo hu cang long)
Ridley Scott – Gladiator
Steven Soderbergh – Erin Brockovich

Best Documentary Film
 Reckless Indifference
Captured on Film: The True Story of Marion Davies
Dark Days
The Eyes of Tammy Faye
Into the Arms of Strangers: Stories of the Kindertransport
One Day in September

Best Editing
 Thirteen Days – Conrad Buff
Crouching Tiger, Hidden Dragon (Wo hu cang long)
Gladiator
Mission: Impossible 2
Traffic

Best Film – Drama
 Traffic
Billy Elliot
Dancer in the Dark
Erin Brockovich
Gladiator
Quills

Best Film – Musical or Comedy
 Nurse Betty
Almost Famous
Best in Show
O Brother, Where Art Thou?
State and Main
Wonder Boys

Best Foreign Language Film
 Crouching Tiger, Hidden Dragon (Wo hu cang long), Taiwan
Goya in Bordeaux (Goya en Burdeos), Spain
His Wife's Diary (Dnevnik ego zheny), Russia
Malèna, Italy
Malli, India
Shower (Xǐ zǎo), China

Best Original Score
 "Gladiator" – Hans Zimmer and Lisa Girrard
"The Legend of Bagger Vance" – Rachel Portman
"Malèna" – Ennio Morricone
"Proof of Life" – Danny Elfman
"Traffic" – Cliff Martinez

Best Original Song
 "I've Seen It All" performed by Björk and Peter Stormare – Dancer in the Dark
"A Fool in Love" – Meet the Parents
"My Funny Friend and Me" – The Emperor's New Groove
"Things Have Changed" – Wonder Boys
"Yours Forever" – The Perfect Storm

Best Screenplay – Adapted
 Quills – Doug Wright
The House of Mirth – Terence Davies
O Brother, Where Art Thou? – Ethan and Joel Coen
Thirteen Days – David Self
Traffic – Stephen Gaghan

Best Screenplay – Original
 You Can Count on Me – Kenneth Lonergan
Almost Famous – Cameron Crowe
Billy Elliot – Lee Hall
Erin Brockovich – Susannah Grant
State and Main – David Mamet

Best Sound
 Dinosaur
Chicken Run
Crouching Tiger, Hidden Dragon (Wo hu cang long)
Mission: Impossible 2
The Perfect Storm

Best Supporting Actor – Drama
 Bruce Greenwood – Thirteen Days
Jeff Bridges – The Contender
Benicio del Toro – Traffic
Robert De Niro – Men of Honor
Albert Finney – Erin Brockovich
Joaquin Phoenix – Gladiator

Best Supporting Actor – Musical or Comedy
 Willem Dafoe – Shadow of the Vampire
Morgan Freeman – Nurse Betty
Philip Seymour Hoffman – Almost Famous
Tim Blake Nelson – O Brother, Where Art Thou?
Brad Pitt – Snatch.
Owen Wilson – Shanghai Noon

Best Supporting Actress – Drama
 Jennifer Ehle – Sunshine (TIE) 
 Rosemary Harris – Sunshine (TIE)
Judi Dench – Chocolat
Catherine Deneuve – Dancer in the Dark
Samantha Morton – Jesus' Son
Julie Walters – Billy Elliot
Kate Winslet – Quills

Best Supporting Actress – Musical or Comedy
 Kate Hudson – Almost Famous
Holly Hunter – O Brother, Where Art Thou?
Frances McDormand – Almost Famous
Catherine O'Hara – Best in Show
Rebecca Pidgeon – State and Main
Marisa Tomei – What Women Want

Best Visual Effects
 Gladiator – John Nelson
Charlie's Angels
How the Grinch Stole Christmas
Mission: Impossible 2
Vertical Limit

Outstanding Motion Picture Ensemble
Traffic

Television winners and nominees

Best Actor – Drama Series
 Tim Daly – The Fugitive
James Gandolfini – The Sopranos
Dennis Haysbert – Now and Again
Nicky Katt – Boston Public
Martin Sheen – The West Wing

Best Actor – Musical or Comedy Series
 Frankie Muniz – Malcolm in the Middle
Robert Guillaume – Sports Night
Sean Hayes – Will & Grace
Stacy Keach – Titus
John Mahoney – Frasier

Best Actor – Miniseries or TV Film
 James Woods – Dirty Pictures
Andy García – For Love or Country: The Arturo Sandoval Story
Louis Gossett Jr. – The Color of Love: Jacey's Story
Bob Hoskins – Noriega: God's Favorite
Matthew Modine – Flowers for Algernon

Best Actress – Drama Series
 Allison Janney – The West Wing
Gillian Anderson – The X-Files
Tyne Daly – Judging Amy
Edie Falco – The Sopranos
Sela Ward – Once and Again

Best Actress – Musical or Comedy Series
 Lisa Kudrow – Friends
Jenna Elfman – Dharma & Greg
Jane Krakowski – Ally McBeal
Wendie Malick – Just Shoot Me!
Laura San Giacomo – Just Shoot Me!

Best Actress – Miniseries or TV Film
 Jill Hennessy – Nuremberg
Jennifer Beals – A House Divided
Holly Hunter – Harlan County War
Gena Rowlands – The Color of Love: Jacey's Story
Vanessa Redgrave – If These Walls Could Talk 2

Best Miniseries
 American Tragedy
The Corner
The Beach Boys: An American Family
Jason and the Argonauts
Sally Hemings: An American Scandal

Best Series – Drama
 The West Wing
The Fugitive
Once and Again
The Practice
The Sopranos

Best Series – Musical or Comedy
 Sex and the City
Frasier
Friends
Just Shoot Me!
The Simpsons

Best TV Film
 Harlan County War
Cheaters
Dirty Pictures
For Love or Country: The Arturo Sandoval Story
Nuremberg

Outstanding Television Ensemble
The West Wing

New Media winners and nominees

Best Internet Site
Inside.com
AtomFilms.com (Atom Films)
Beatnik.com (Beatnik)
Launch.com (Launch Media)
RealGuide.com (Real Networks)

Computer Educational
Family Tree Maker 8.0 Deluxe
Acid DJ 2.0
Barbie Magic Genie Bottle
Nancy Drew: Message in a Haunted Mansion

Computer Software
Adobe Photoshop 6.0
Giants: Citizen Kabuto
Mechanical Warrior IV
The Sims
Tomb Raider Chronicles

Video Game
Perfect Dark
007: The World Is Not Enough
FIFA 2001 Major League Soccer
Final Fantasy IX
Quake II

Awards breakdown

Film
Winners:
3 / 9 Traffic: Best Director / Best Film – Drama / Outstanding Motion Picture Ensemble
3 / 10 Gladiator: Best Cinematography / Best Original Score / Best Visual Effects
2 / 2 Sunshine: Best Supporting Actress – Drama (2x)
2 / 3 Nurse Betty: Best Actress – Musical or Comedy / Best Film – Musical or Comedy
2 / 3 Thirteen Days: Best Editing / Best Supporting Actor – Drama
2 / 5 Quills: Best Actor – Drama / Best Screenplay – Adapted
1 / 1 Reckless Indifference: Best Documentary Film
1 / 1 Requiem for a Dream: Best Actress – Drama
1 / 1 Shadow of the Vampire: Best Supporting Actor – Musical or Comedy
1 / 2 Chicken Run: Best Animated or Mixed Media Film
1 / 2 Dinosaur: Best Sound
1 / 2 You Can Count on Me: Best Screenplay – Original
1 / 3 How the Grinch Stole Christmas: Best Costume Design
1 / 3 Wonder Boys: Best Actor – Musical or Comedy
1 / 4 Dancer in the Dark: Best Original Song
1 / 4 The House of Mirth: Best Art Direction
1 / 6 Almost Famous: Best Supporting Actress – Musical or Comedy
1 / 7 Crouching Tiger, Hidden Dragon (Wo hu cang long): Best Foreign Language Film

Losers:
0 / 5 Erin Brockovich, O Brother, Where Art Thou?
0 / 4 Billy Elliot, Mission: Impossible 2
0 / 3 Best in Show, State and Main
0 / 2 Charlie's Angels, The Contender, The Emperor's New Groove, Keeping the Faith, The Legend of Bagger Vance, Malèna, The Perfect Storm

Television
Winners:
3 / 4 The West Wing: Best Actress – Drama Series / Best Series – Drama / Outstanding Television Ensemble
1 / 1 American Tragedy: Best Miniseries
1 / 1 Malcolm in the Middle: Best Actor – Musical or Comedy Series
1 / 1 Sex and the City: Best Series – Musical or Comedy
1 / 2 Dirty Pictures: Best Actor – Miniseries or TV Film
1 / 2 Friends: Best Actress – Musical or Comedy Series
1 / 2 The Fugitive: Best Actor – Drama Series
1 / 2 Harlan County War: Best TV Film
1 / 2 Nuremberg: Best Actress – Miniseries or TV Film

Losers:
0 / 3 Just Shoot Me!, The Sopranos
0 / 2 The Color of Love: Jacey's Story, For Love or Country: The Arturo Sandoval Story, Frasier, Once and Again

References

External links
2001 5th Annual SATELLITE™ Awards Nominees and Winners

Satellite Awards ceremonies
2000 awards
2000 film awards
2000 television awards